The Distance Between is the third studio album by Canadian new wave band Strange Advance.  It was released in 1988, and featured the Canadian hit single "Love Becomes Electric". The album was remastered and re-released on CD in 2016 with two bonus tracks, an extended club mix of "Love Becomes Electric" and the previously unreleased song, "Flow My Tears".

Track listing

2016 reissue bonus tracks

Album credits

Personnel
Darryl Kromm – Vocals, Guitar, Twelve-string guitar
Drew Arnott –  Vocals, Keyboards, Programming

with:

Andrew Arnott – Alto Saxophone
Dawnlea Arnott – Soprano Vocals
Howard Ayee – Bass, Backing Vocals 
Randy Bachman – Guitar
Simon Brierley – Guitar
Ian Cameron – Guitar, Violin
Greg Critchley – Drums
Peter Fredette – Backing Vocals
Matthew Gerrard – Bass
Kenny Greer – Pedal Steel Guitar
Allan Holdsworth – Guitar
Jim Hubay – Guitar
Joe Primeau – Backing Vocals
Ed Shaw – Guitar
Storm – Backing Vocals
Owen Tennyson – Drums
Steve Webster – Bass

Production
Producers: Drew Arnott, Howard Ayee, Joe Primeau
Engineers: Joe Primeau, Lenny DeRose
Mixed by Lenny DeRose
except "Who Lives Next Door" mixed by Bob Rock 
Emulator Programming: Billy Chapman 
Additional Programming: Gerald O'Brien, Howard Ayee, Scott Humphries
Mastered by Bob Ludwig

References

External links
 Discogs.com - The Distance Between entry

1988 albums
Strange Advance albums